Funktion-One is a British loudspeaker manufacturer based in Dorking, Surrey, England. The company was formed in 1992 by Tony Andrews and John Newsham.

Widely known for their distinctive purple cabinets and white axehead drivers, Funktion-One systems have been popularly employed in notable dance music venues across the globe including Berghain (Berlin), Jaeger (Oslo), Cocoricò (Riccione), Marquee (New York), The Block (Tel Aviv), Laura's Shed (Kinvara), École Privée (Montreal), Smartbar (Chicago), Colosseum (Jakarta), and Shelter (Amsterdam).

History
The company was formed in 1992 by Tony Andrews and John Newsham, following their departure from Turbosound - a company focused on sound systems for music festivals they had started in 1978. Following eight years of research and development, Funktion-One completed its first major project - designing and installing a sound system for the Millennium Dome's Central Show. Since then the company has built a reputation in installed sound.

According to Andrews, the company's name spells "funktion" with a "k" as a reference to 1970s funk music.

Funktion-One equipment, installed by Sound Investment Audio, is in use at many music venues in the United States.

Notable projects
2000: Millennium Dome, London, England

Funktion-One were chosen to provide the sound system for the Millennium Dome's Central Show. This was the first official Funktion-One installation, ostensibly the debut of the company's Resolution line of loudspeakers.

2002-2014: Space, Ibiza

Funktion-One's relationship with Space began in 2002, following a recommendation from We Love... promoter Darren Hughes. After an initial installation on the club's Terrace, Funktion-One systems were gradually introduced to five of the venue's six rooms - including the 2,000-capacity main space, known as La Discoteca.

2003: Cielo, New York, USA

Cielo nightclub marked the first US sound installation by Funktion-One. Located in the Meatpacking District of Manhattan, on opening, the main room featured an AX88 double 8" passive loud speakers, Infra Bass Sub Enclosures and F218 double 18" subwoofers.

2004: Berghain, Berlin, Germany

Berghain is one of the company's largest installs, and the first in Berlin. At its launch, the sound system comprised four Funktion-One Dance Stacks (consisting of a DS210, a DS215 and three F218), one Double Infrahorn (consisting of two Infrabass, one Doublehorn Extension), and two Resolution 2 for monitoring. The system was installed by Benedikt Koch of Funktion-One Germany, who has stated that - as one of the most powerful club systems in the world - it operates at only 10 to 20 percent of its full capacity.

2018: Volgograd Arena World Cup Stadium

Funktion-One Russia supplied and installed a permanent state of the art sound system for Volgograd Arena — one of the Russian World Cup 2018 stadia. Working closely with the Funktion-One design team in the UK, the company specified a system that features 638 Funktion-One loudspeakers and 50 MC2 Audio amplifiers.

Products 
• Resolution Series (introduced 2000)

• Dance Stack (introduced 2002) - originally designed for Maze nightclub in Miami

• Evolution Series (introduced 2015)

• Vero (introduced 2016) - a large format touring sound system

References

British companies established in 1992
1992 establishments in England
Companies based in Surrey
Loudspeaker manufacturers
Audio equipment manufacturers of the United Kingdom